Angiopoietin-related protein 1 also known as angiopoietin-3 (ANG-3) is a protein that in humans is encoded by the ANGPTL1 gene.

Function 

Angiopoietins are members of the vascular endothelial growth factor family and the only known growth factors largely specific for vascular endothelium. Angiopoietin-1, angiopoietin-2, and angiopoietin-4 participate in the formation of blood vessels. 

The protein encoded by this gene is another member of the angiopoietin family that is widely expressed in adult tissues with mRNA levels highest in highly vascularized tissues. This protein was found to be a secretory protein that does not act as an endothelial cell mitogen in vitro.

References

External links

Further reading